The 1922 Western Kentucky State Normal football team represented Western Kentucky State Normal School and Teachers College (now known as Western Kentucky University) in the 1922 college football season.  They were coached by legendary basketball coach Edgar Diddle in his first year as football coach.  His team set a school record for wins that would not be matched for 30 years and not broken until 1963.

Schedule

References

Western Kentucky State Normal
Western Kentucky Hilltoppers football seasons
Western Kentucky State Normal football